A memory hole is any mechanism for the deliberate alteration or disappearance of inconvenient or embarrassing documents, photographs, transcripts or other records, such as from a website or other archive, particularly as part of an attempt to give the impression that something never happened. The concept was first popularized by George Orwell's 1949 dystopian novel Nineteen Eighty-Four, where the Party's Ministry of Truth systematically re-created all potentially embarrassing historical documents, in effect, re-writing all of history to match the often-changing state propaganda. These changes were complete and undetectable.

Origins
In Nineteen Eighty-Four the "memory hole" is a small chute leading to a large incinerator used for :censorship:

Nineteen Eighty-Fours protagonist Winston Smith, who works in the Ministry of Truth, is routinely assigned the task of revising old newspaper articles in order to serve the propaganda interests of the government. In one instance, the weekly chocolate ration was decreased from 30 grams to 20. The next day the newspaper announced that the chocolate ration had not been reduced to 20 grams per week, but increased to 20 grams. Any previous mention of the ration having been 30 grams per week needed to be destroyed.

The memory hole is referenced while O'Brien tortures Smith; O'Brien produces evidence of a coverup by the Party, exciting Smith that such documentation exists.  However, O'Brien then destroys the evidence in the memory hole and denies not only the existence of the evidence but also any memory of his actions.  Smith realizes that this is doublethink in action, as O'Brien has actively suppressed his memory of both a politically inconvenient fact and his action taken to destroy the evidence of it.

See also

 /dev/null
 Ash heap of history
 Bit bucket
 Blue wall of silence
 Burn bag
 Damnatio memoriae
 Groupthink
 Pact of forgetting
 Propaganda
 Retcon
 Historical revisionism
 Right to be forgotten
 Social control
 Spiral of silence
 Censorship of images in the Soviet Union
 The Memory Hole, a website whose goal was to preserve documents which were in danger of being lost

ReferencesNotes Phelps, Richard P. (2020, Summer) Down the Memory Hole: Evidence on Educational Testing, Academic Questions.Sources'''

 George Orwell, Nineteen Eighty-Four'', first published by Martin Secker & Warburg, London, 1949. This reference, Penguin Books pocket edition, 1954.

External links 
 

Fictional elements introduced in 1949
English phrases
Historical negationism
Nineteen Eighty-Four
Political catchphrases